The Green Goblin, a Marvel Comics supervillain, and one of the three  Archenemies of Spider-Man, alongside Doctor Octopus and Venom, was created by Stan Lee and Steve Ditko and first appeared in The Amazing Spider-Man #14 (July 1964). The character has since been substantially adapted from the comics into various forms of media, such as feature films, television series and video games.

In the comics, the Green Goblin is an alias adopted by multiple characters, most prominently Norman Osborn, who has also been used as the Goblin's alter-ego in most of the character's media appearances. Norman was portrayed by Willem Dafoe in Sam Raimi's Spider-Man film trilogy and the Marvel Cinematic Universe film Spider-Man: No Way Home (2021), and by Chris Cooper in The Amazing Spider-Man 2 (2014). Neil Ross, Alan Rachins, Steve Blum, Steven Weber and Josh Keaton have provided the character's voices in various Spider-Man animated series. Harry is portrayed by James Franco in the Spider-Man trilogy and by Dane DeHaan in The Amazing Spider-Man 2, and voiced by Gary Imhoff, Ian Ziering, James Arnold Taylor, Matt Lanter and Max Mittleman, among others.

Television

Spider-Man (1967–1970) 
The Norman Osborn incarnation of the Green Goblin appears in Spider-Man (1967), voiced by Len Carlson. This version is a dimwitted, spoiled robber who is obsessed with magic and the supernatural - fields of expertise that the original comics iteration was never interested in.

Spider-Man (1981–1982) 
The Norman Osborn incarnation of the Green Goblin appears in the Spider-Man (1981) episode "Revenge of the Green Goblin", voiced by Neil Ross. Three years earlier, he fought Spider-Man, during which the foes discovered each other's identities. Following his defeat, the Goblin lost his memories. After regaining it during a train accident, he reassumes his Goblin persona and equipment and threatens to reveal Spider-Man's identity to the world.

Spider-Man and His Amazing Friends (1981–1983)  
The Norman Osborn incarnation of the Green Goblin appears in the Spider-Man and His Amazing Friends episode "Triumph of the Green Goblin", voiced by Dennis Marks. This version is an alternate personality of Norman's who occasionally takes over to commit crimes. Osborn also has a niece, Mona Osborn (voiced by Sally Julian), who was unaware of her uncle's double life. Norman turns into the Goblin again after a plane crash and kidnaps Mona to lead him to the location of his formula so he can transform New York's population into goblins. However, Norman is eventually cured by lightning and sent back to a medical institute.

Spider-Man (1994–1998) 
The Norman and Harry Osborn incarnations of the Green Goblin appear in Spider-Man: The Animated Series.

The series' version of Norman (voiced again by Neil Ross) is the owner of OsCorp Industries, a weapons manufacturing company under the influence of the Kingpin, whom Norman later attempts to assassinate via the Hobgoblin, and has a vendetta against Spider-Man. Norman eventually becomes the Green Goblin following a gas accident at OsCorp that causes him to develop an alternate, more violent, and chaotic personality. Using an altered version of the Hobgoblin suit, the Goblin targets Norman's rivals, but is defeated by Spider-Man, though his identity remains a secret and Norman is shown to have no memory of the Goblin's actions. Later, the Goblin resurfaces inside Norman and seeks to eliminate Spider-Man, the Kingpin, and the Hobgoblin. In pursuit of this, he obtains a time dilation accelerator and, after learning Spider-Man's secret identity, kidnaps Mary Jane Watson and throws her into a dimensional portal opened by the accelerator. After Spider-Man defeats him, the Goblin ends up falling into the same portal and becomes trapped in Limbo.

The series' version of Harry (voiced by Gary Imhoff) is Peter Parker's best friend, though he grows jealous of him after Parker begins dating Watson. Following Norman and Watson's disappearances, Harry becomes furious with Spider-Man, whom he blames for the incident. The former is eventually driven insane and begins having visions of the Goblin, who offers to tell him where his father is if he kills Spider-Man. Harry becomes the second Green Goblin to exact revenge on the web-slinger, but is defeated by Spider-Man and the Punisher and sent to Ravencroft, where he receives medical treatment for his insanity. After Watson returns, Harry escapes and crashes her and Parker's wedding, demanding that she marry him instead. However, Liz Allan reveals her hidden feelings for Harry and convinces him that his friends care about him as well. Harry surrenders and returns to Ravencroft to continue his treatment.

An alternate universe version of Norman Osborn / Green Goblin also appears in the two-part series finale "Spider Wars". In an alternate reality where Spider-Carnage destroyed New York, the Goblin became one of his enforcers, only to be defeated by a number of Spider-Men from different realities.

Spider-Man Unlimited (1999–2001) 
A Counter-Earth incarnation of the Green Goblin appears in Spider-Man Unlimited (1999), voiced by Rino Romano. This version is Hector Jones, a heroic figure and ally of the Rejects, a group of Bestials who the High Evolutionary deemed useless and abandoned who helps the rebellion against the High Evolutionary and possesses a backpack that sprouts wings instead of a glider.

Spider-Man: The New Animated Series (2003) 
Harry Osborn appears in Spider-Man: The New Animated Series, voiced by Ian Ziering. This version is blonde and Peter Parker's best friend who despises Spider-Man, blaming the web-slinger for his father's death prior to the series. However, Harry shows signs of beginning to put the grudge aside in later episodes.

Norman Osborn is alluded to several times, making small cameos as both a hallucination to Harry and in a photograph. Sometime prior to the series, he operated as the Green Goblin before he was killed in battle against Spider-Man, with only the web-slinger being aware of his alter-ego.

The Spectacular Spider-Man (2008–2009) 
The Norman Osborn incarnation of the Green Goblin and Harry Osborn appear in The Spectacular Spider-Man.

The series' version of Norman (voiced by Alan Rachins) is Oscorp's cold and calculating head who is known to never apologize and has a strained relationship with his son. In the first season, he is hired by Tombstone to create several supervillains to distract Spider-Man from Tombstone's criminal activities. The Goblin (voiced by Steve Blum) later appears as a mysterious criminal equipped with stolen Oscorp technology who seeks to overthrow Tombstone as New York's reigning crime boss. After two battles with Spider-Man, Norman flees and secretly frames Harry as the Goblin, using his son's theft of and addiction to Oscorp's "Gobulin Green" formula to further the lie. In the second season, Norman returns to hire Miles Warren to work at Empire State University's labs and mentor Peter Parker. After Tombstone, Silvermane, and Doctor Octopus are all arrested by Spider-Man, Norman reassumes the Goblin alias and resurfaces as the second "Big Man of Crime". After two failed attempts to kill Spider-Man, Norman hires the Chameleon to pose as him while he faces the web-slinger one more time as the Goblin. In the ensuing fight, Norman reveals he framed Harry to protect his identity and Harry himself before Norman is seemingly killed by a hidden cache of pumpkin bombs. However, Norman is later shown to have survived and leaves New York under a false identity.

The series' version of Harry (voiced by James Arnold Taylor) is Peter Parker and Gwen Stacy's best friend who longs to impress his father. In the first season, the stress and constant disappointment in his life prompt him to steal "Gobulin Green", an experimental Oscorp formula that increases his self-esteem and aggressiveness. He is later framed as the Goblin, taken on a tour of Europe to overcome his addiction, and promises Spider-Man not to become the Goblin again in exchange for the web-slinger protecting his secret. In the second season, Harry begins dating Stacy and later helps Spider-Man unmask Norman as the real Goblin. After Norman is seemingly killed in battle against Spider-Man, Harry vows revenge against the latter.

Ultimate Spider-Man (2012–2017) 
Several depictions of the Green Goblin appear in Ultimate Spider-Man (2012):
 The Norman Osborn incarnation of the Green Goblin (voiced by Steven Weber) is Oscorp's manipulative CEO, the estranged father of Harry, and a recurring nemesis of Spider-Man who possesses the Ultimate Marvel iteration's green-skinned monstrous appearance coupled with his mainstream incarnation's use of a glider and pumpkin bombs. In the first season, Norman employs Doctor Octopus to aid him in his plot to obtain Spider-Man's DNA and create a "spider-soldier" army. After Doc Ock's work results in the Venom symbiote's creation and bonding to Harry, Norman considers using his son to further his plans. He later lures Spider-Man to Oscorp's secret lab, but Doc Ock betrays Norman by injecting him with a serum mixed with Spider-Man and Venom's DNA, resulting in his Goblin transformation. Initially savage and mindless, the Goblin soon regains his intelligence and later attacks the S.H.I.E.L.D. Helicarrier, stealing a glider and electric gauntlets. When Venom resurfaces inside Harry, the Goblin tries to have Venom join him, but fails before escaping with the symbiote. In the second season, the Goblin returns to kidnap Parker and inject him with a symbiote sample, turning Parker into Carnage to kill Spider-Man. However, Harry re-bonds with Venom and defeats the Goblin, forcing him to flee. The Goblin later allows himself to be captured and taken to S.H.I.E.L.D.'s Tri-Carrier so he can infect everyone aboard with the symbiote, briefly turning himself into Venom to combat Spider-Man once more until Doc Ock creates a cure for the symbiote infection, restoring Norman' human form in the process. Following this, he attempts to make amends as the anti-hero Iron Patriot and fights alongside Spider-Man and his team, but Doc Ock turns Norman back into the Goblin, who attempts to turn all of New York into goblins as well before Spider-Man thwarts his plans and captures him. In the third season, Ultimate Spider-Man: Web Warriors, the Goblin is unintentionally released during a battle between the New Warriors and Taskmaster's Thunderbolts and steals the Siege Perilous. After trapping Electro inside it, he opens a portal to the multiverse, steals DNA samples from various alternate reality versions of Spider-Man, and uses them to mutate himself into the Spider-Goblin. While fighting his version of Spider-Man, the Goblin reveals he deduced the web-slinger's identity. After being defeated by Spider-Man and his alternate reality counterparts however, Norman loses his memories and turns back to normal. In a dream created by Nightmare depicting an alternate future where Parker stopped being Spider-Man, Norman became the Goblin King, killed most of Earth's heroes, and took their weapons as trophies. As of the fourth season, Spider-Man vs. the Sinister Six, Norman inoculated himself with an anti-goblin serum, re-adopts his Iron Patriot alias, and becomes an ally to Spider-Man once more. In the series finale, it is revealed Norman recovered his memories, but chose to keep Spider-Man's identity secret out of respect.
 A female alternate universe incarnation of Norman named Norma Osborn (voiced by Wendie Malick) appears in the episode "The Spider-Verse" Pt 1. As the Green Goblin, she wears a variation of the traditional costume coupled with gauntlets like the "prime" version and serves as the archenemy of Petra Parker / Spider-Girl. After the aforementioned "prime" Goblin arrives in her universe, they join forces to destroy their respective versions of Spider-Man, only for Norma to be defeated while Norman escapes to another reality.
 Harry Osborn (voiced by Matt Lanter) is Peter Parker's best friend, Norman's estranged son, a student at Midtown High School, and a friend to Mary Jane Watson and Flash Thompson. During the first two seasons, he becomes the Venom symbiote's first and primary host and fights Spider-Man and his allies several times before eventually rejecting Venom's control. He also mends his relationship with Norman after his father is restored to normal. After making minor appearances in Web Warriors, Harry joins Spider-Man in fighting crime in vs. the Sinister Six as the superhero Patrioteer and temporarily becomes the Anti-Venom symbiote's host to save Manhattan from Carnage before joining the S.H.I.E.L.D. Academy in the series finale.
 A variation of the Ultimate Marvel Green Goblin sporting the MC2 incarnation's demonic wings also appears in the third and fourth seasons, also voiced by Steven Weber. Following an encounter and fight with the "prime" Spider-Man and Miles Morales / Kid Arachnid, Doctor Octopus brings this version of the Goblin to his universe to recruit him into his Hydra-backed Sinister Six, though they are defeated.

Spider-Man (2017–2020) 
Norman and Harry Osborn appear in Marvel's Spider-Man (2017).

The series' version of Harry Osborn (voiced by Max Mittelman) is the creator of Goblin technology, which he later uses to fight crime as the superhero Hobgoblin. Additionally, he is Peter Parker's best friend, a student at Horizon High, later Osborn Academy, and a friend to Miles Morales / Ultimate Spider-Man, Gwen Stacy / Ghost Spider and Anya Corazon / Spider-Girl. Throughout the first season, he views Spider-Man as a menace during their various encounters. While helping to create a cure for the Jackal's spider-virus, Harry discovers Parker is Spider-Man, which fractures their friendship. The former's views on the web-slinger are apparently confirmed after Spider-Man joins the Sinister Six, but Harry learns Spider-Man was brainwashed by Doctor Octopus and frees Spider-Man, mending their friendship in the process. Harry also learns Norman's true colors, choosing to support Spider-Man and disavowing his father. In subsequent seasons, Harry becomes Oscorp's new CEO and continues to assist Spider-Man and the Spider Team combat various supervillains, such as the Goblin Nation and the Dark Goblin.

The series' version of Norman Osborn (voiced by Josh Keaton.) is Harry's strict father and Oscorp's CEO with high expectations and a willingness to steal others' technology to pass off as his own. In the first season, he secretly causes Harry's suspension Horizon High and establishes the Osborn Academy for Geniuses to save him from embarrassment while plotting against Spider-Man, Max Modell, and the Jackal. After being exposed to the Jackal's spider-virus, Norman mutates into the Spider-King before he is cured by the Spider Team. Norman later entrusts Harry with killing Spider-Man so that his son will be New York's only protector. However, Harry refuses and Norman impersonates the Hobgoblin in an attempt to kill Spider-Man himself, ultimately confronting Spider-Man and Harry in his lab until he is seemingly killed in a chemical explosion. Norman returns in the third season Maximum Venom as the Dark Goblin, having formulated a conspiracy that results in a symbiote invasion of Earth and turning the board of education against the web-slinger. However, the Spider Team expose his conspiracy and revert him to his human form before he is taken into custody.

Spidey and His Amazing Friends (2021) 
The Green Goblin appears in Spidey and His Amazing Friends, voiced by JP Karliak. This version seeks to play tricks on the general public and humiliate Spider-Man rather than commit crimes.

Spider-Man: Freshman Year (2024) 
Norman and Harry Osborn will appear as supporting characters in the upcoming Marvel Cinematic Universe (MCU) / Disney+ animated series Spider-Man: Freshman Year (2024). The former will be a mentor to Peter Parker while the latter will be one of his classmates.

Other appearances 
 The Norman Osborn incarnation of the Green Goblin appears in Marvel Disk Wars: The Avengers, voiced by Yusuke Numata in Japanese and Kirk Thornton in English.
 The Norman Osborn incarnation of the Green Goblin appears in Marvel Future Avengers, voiced by Hiroshi Yanaka in Japanese and Dave Wittenberg in English.

Film

Sam Raimi film series 

Both the Norman Osborn and Harry Osborn incarnations of the Green Goblin appear in Sam Raimi's Spider-Man trilogy, portrayed by Willem Dafoe and James Franco respectively. 
 The Osborns first appear in Spider-Man (2002), with Norman initially serving as a father figure and mentor for Peter Parker while Harry is Parker's best friend and Mary Jane Watson's boyfriend for a significant part of the film who longs to impress his distant father. After experimenting on himself with an unstable strength enhancer to save his company, Oscorp, from bankruptcy, Norman develops a crazed alternate personality dubbed the "Green Goblin". While in control of Norman's body, the Goblin uses stolen experimental armor and advanced weaponry to exact revenge on their enemies, seeing Norman as too "weak" to do so himself. This brings him into conflict with Spider-Man, whom the Goblin initially tries to persuade to join him before resolving to attack his loved ones after deducing his identity as Parker. After Norman is fatally impaled by his glider during his final battle with Spider-Man, the latter brings his body home, where Harry sees them and mistakenly assumes that Spider-Man killed his father, vowing revenge.
 In Spider-Man 2 (2004), Norman serves as a ghostly presence to Harry, who has taken over Oscorp and still seeks revenge on Spider-Man. Harry strikes a deal with Otto Octavius / Doctor Octopus to retrieve Spider-Man in exchange for giving the latter tritium to complete his experiment, only to learn Parker is Spider-Man. Following this, Harry is initially reluctant to take vengeance on his best friend despite his father's urging, after which he stumbles upon Norman's secret lair and discovers that he was the Green Goblin.
 In Spider-Man 3 (2007), Harry becomes the New Goblin to avenge his father, but accidentally gets partial amnesia. After he recovers, he sabotages Parker and Watson's relationship as part of a scheme to emotionally hurt Parker. Upon learning the truth of Norman's death from his butler Bernard, Harry reconciles and joins forces with Parker to save Watson from Venom and Sandman before sacrifices himself to save Parker from the former.

The Amazing Spider-Man film series 
 Norman Osborn is mentioned in The Amazing Spider-Man (2012) as the founder of Oscorp who is dying from an unknown disease. 
 Norman and Harry Osborn appear in The Amazing Spider-Man 2 (2014), portrayed by Chris Cooper and Dane DeHaan respectively. In this film, the disease is revealed to be the fictional "retroviral hyperplasia", a genetic disease that has afflicted the Osborns for generations. After Norman's death, the returning Harry is made CEO and tries to find the missing Richard Parker's data in the hopes that it will save his life. Harry later becomes the Green Goblin due to a corrupted cure and swears vengeance on Peter Parker after realizing his true identity and was refused a blood transfusion that he thought could save him, inadvertently killing Gwen Stacy in front of Parker in the process.
 Cooper and DeHaan were set to reprise their roles in a Sinister Six spinoff film and a third The Amazing Spider-Man film, but both were cancelled.

Marvel Cinematic Universe 
Willem Dafoe reprises his role as Norman Osborn / Green Goblin from Sam Raimi's Spider-Man trilogy in the Marvel Cinematic Universe (MCU) film Spider-Man: No Way Home (2021). He is transported into another universe due to its version of Peter Parker (later dubbed "Peter-One") botching Doctor Strange's spell to make everyone forget his identity as Spider-Man, which instead results in people from across the multiverse who know Parker's identity as Spider-Man being brought to their universe before their impending deaths. While battling the Goblin persona and attempting to regain his bearings, a lost and overwhelmed Norman seeks refuge at May Parker's shelter and meets Peter-One before being imprisoned in the New York Sanctum alongside other universe-displaced supervillains. Peter-One attempts to cure the villains in the hopes of averting their original fates upon returning to their respective universes, but the Goblin persona takes over Norman's body and convinces the other villains to fight back instead. In the ensuing battle, he kills May in an attempt to corrupt Peter-One before escaping.  After the other villains are defeated and cured by Peter-One, his own Parker ("Peter-Two"), and another version ("Peter-Three"), the Goblin breaks the barrier between universes, fights Peter-One, and goads the latter into killing him, only to be foiled by Peter-Two. Afterwards, Peter-One and Peter-Three cure Osborn, ridding him of the Goblin persona, before Strange casts another spell to return all of the displaced individuals to their original universes.

Other appearances 
 The Norman Osborn incarnation of the Green Goblin appears in Spider-Man: Into the Spider-Verse, voiced by Jorma Taccone. This version takes heavy inspiration from the Ultimate Marvel iteration, though he features visual elements from various other previous incarnations. Additionally, he works as an enforcer for the Kingpin. While fighting Spider-Man to protect the Kingpin's Super-Collider, the Goblin shoves the former into it, resulting in an explosion that severely injures Spider-Man and kills the Goblin.

Video games

Spider-Man games

 The Norman Osborn incarnation of the Green Goblin appears as a boss in Spider-Man (1982).
 The Norman Osborn incarnation of the Green Goblin appears as a boss in Spider-Man: The Video Game.
 The Norman Osborn incarnation of the Green Goblin appears a boss in Spider-Man (1995).
 The Norman Osborn incarnation of the Green Goblin appears as a boss in The Amazing Spider-Man: Lethal Foes.
 The Norman Osborn incarnation of the Green Goblin appears as the final boss of the Spider-Man film tie-in game, with Willem Dafoe reprising his role from the film. In a departure from the film's plot, Osborn and his scientists initially attempt to capture Spider-Man to study his genetics and perfect their super-soldier serum. To do so, they create and send several flying robots and spider-shaped robots to track him down, but both of these attempts fail. After being fired for taking too much time to develop the serum, Osborn decides to try it on himself, which leads to his transformation into the Goblin. From here, the game's plot closely follows the film's.
 The Harry Osborn incarnation of the Green Goblin (voiced by Josh Keaton) appears as an unlockable playable character and has a bonus storyline in the game, wherein he becomes the new Green Goblin after his father's death and investigates a plot to take over Oscorp while battling a separate Goblin who claims to have been hired by Norman.
 Harry Osborn appears in the Spider-Man 2 film tie-in game, voiced again by Josh Keaton.
 The Ultimate Marvel incaranation of the Green Goblin appears as a boss in Ultimate Spider-Man (2005), voiced by Peter Lurie. This version is a prisoner of S.H.I.E.L.D.
 The Ultimate Marvel incarnation of the Green Goblin appears as a playable character in and the final boss of Spider-Man: Battle for New York, voiced by Neil Kaplan.
 Harry Osborn / New Goblin appears as a boss and playable character in the Spider-Man 3 film tie-in game, with James Franco reprising his role from the film. While normally unplayable outside of the final mission of the game, the New Goblin was later released as DLC, which was initially available for the Xbox 360 version and the Collector's Edition of the PlayStation 3 versions before it was later added to all other platforms.
 Norman Osborn / Green Goblin and Harry Osborn / New Goblin appear as unlockable playable characters in Spider-Man: Friend or Foe, voiced by Roger L. Jackson and again by Josh Keaton respectively. Both versions' designs are based on the Sam Raimi trilogy versions. The Green Goblin and several supervillains fight Spider-Man and the New Goblin until they are all attacked by P.H.A.N.T.O.M.s under Mysterio's command and captured. While the New Goblin's whereabouts are unknown, the Green Goblin is placed under mind control and sent to retrieve a meteor shard from Tokyo. There, Spider-Man defeats the Goblin and destroys the mind-control device. The latter then joins forces with Spider-Man to exact revenge on Mysterio.
 The Norman Osborn incarnation of the Green Goblin appears as an optional assist character in the Nintendo DS version of Spider-Man: Web of Shadows, voiced again by Roger L. Jackson. After Black Cat informs Spider-Man that the Goblin is planting bombs as part of a plot to defeat the symbiotes invading Manhattan, Spider-Man is given the choice of helping him twice.
 The Ultimate Marvel incarnation of the Green Goblin appears in Ultimate Spider-Man: Total Mayhem.
 The Marvel Noir incarnation of Norman Osborn / Goblin appears as a boss in Spider-Man: Shattered Dimensions, voiced by Jim Cummings. A powerful mob boss, he tasks his enforcers Hammerhead and the Vulture with retrieving fragments of the Tablet of Order and Chaos. Though Spider-Man Noir manages to keep most of them out of his possession, Osborn eventually obtains one and absorbs its power, transforming into a monstrous form with incredible strength. Despite this, the process opens a massive sore on his back that becomes his only weak point. He then lures Spider-Man Noir to his carnival hideout, using hostages as bait. There, Spider-Man Noir defeats the Goblin and his men and claims his fragment.
 The Norman Osborn incarnation of the Green Goblin appears in Pinball FX 2 via the Spider-Man table.
 The Harry Osborn incarnation of the Green Goblin appears in The Amazing Spider-Man 2 film tie-in game, voiced by Kevin Dorman. Similarly to the film, Harry becomes the CEO of Oscorp after his father dies from a terminal illness and later discovers that he is slowly dying from the same illness, becoming desperate for a cure. In a departure from the film's plot, Harry also works with Wilson Fisk to finance the Enhanced Crime Task Force, ostensibly to help the police contain criminals more easily, unaware that Fisk is planning to use it to replace Spider-Man and eventually take over Oscorp once Harry dies. After discovering that Spider-Man's blood could help cure him, Harry asks for his help, but Spider-Man refuses out of fear of the side effects, leading Harry to despise him. Harry later injects himself with Richard Parker's spider venom in the hopes of curing his illness, but it disfigures him and drives him insane. Adopting the Green Goblin alias, he attacks Spider-Man, but is defeated and incarcerated. In the mobile version of the game, the Goblin is a supervillain working for Oscorp who attacks Spider-Man twice in an attempt to collect his blood for Oscorp's experiments as well as exact revenge on him for intervening in Oscorp's illicit businesses.
 The mainstream and "House of M" incarnations of the Green Goblin appear as bosses in the Spider-Man Unlimited (2014). They are assembled from various alternate realities to join a multiversal Sinister Six and invade other dimensions, destroy their respective Spider-Men, and collect iso-8 crystals. Additionally, Norman Osborn as the Red Goblin was added as a playable character in a later update.

Marvel's Spider-Man series 
Norman and Harry Osborn appear in Insomniac Games' Marvel's Spider-Man series, voiced by Mark Rolston and initially Scott Porter respectively. Additionally, Norman's wife and Harry's mother, Emily Osborn, makes a cameo appearance as a photograph.

 The franchise's version of Norman is the corrupt and self-serving former CEO and co-founder of Oscorp alongside his former best friend and college lab partner Otto Octavius, and the mayor of New York City. Throughout Spider-Man (2018), he uses his position to implement Oscorp technology throughout New York City and shut down government funding for Octavius Industries in a thinly-veiled attempt to get Octavius to rejoin Oscorp, though Octavius refuses out of contempt. Norman also attempts to have Octavius' assistant Peter Parker join Oscorp by using his friendship with Harry, though Parker also refuses. Years prior, Norman and Oscorp created "Devil's Breath", an experimental medical treatment for genetic disorders that more closely resembles a bio-weapon, in an effort to save Emily and later Harry, both of whom suffered from terminal illness, but was forced to put Harry in stasis until he can find a cure while lying to Parker and Mary Jane Watson that he was in Europe managing Oscorp internationally. Norman's work with the Devil's Breath resulted in Martin Li becoming Mister Negative, accidentally killing his parents, and seeking revenge against Norman for what happened to him in the present. After Octavius becomes Doctor Octopus, he joins forces with Li and four other supervillains to attack Oscorp properties and steal Devil's Breath to infect New York in an attempt to expose Norman and his lies, resulting in Norman declaring martial law and hiring mercenaries to protect New York's citizens as well as branding Spider-Man as a fugitive. While Spider-Man is able to defeat Li, Octavius, and the other villains, contain the resulting damage, and save Norman's life, the latter's role in creating Devil's Breath is exposed, leading to Norman resigning as mayor in disgrace. A year later, during Spider-Man: Miles Morales, he orders Dr. Curt Connors to free his son from stasis despite the potential danger.
 The franchise's version of Harry is Peter Parker and Mary Jane Watson's best friend who is aware of his father's dishonesty and selfishness, but genuinely loves him nonetheless and, unlike him, is selfless and caring towards others. He was inspired by his mother, Emily, to study environmental law and used Oscorp's resources to install various research stations across New York to monitor environmental conditions, which Spider-Man visits and helps out with as part of a side mission. Despite suffering from the rare and fictional Oshtoran Syndrome, which killed Emily, Harry kept this from his friends in the guise of constant business and partying making him feel worn out. Harry asked Norman to reveal the truth should his condition get worse, though the former secretly refused and put him in stasis.

Other games
 The Sam Raimi Spider-Man trilogy's incarnation of Norman Osborn / Green Goblin appears in the Spider-Man Trilogy pinball machine.
 The Norman Osborn incarnation of the Green Goblin appears as a playable character in Marvel: Ultimate Alliance 2, voiced by Armin Shimerman. This version's default appearance is based on Norman's Thunderbolts design. He is among several supervillains controlled by S.H.I.E.L.D.'s Nanites until they go rogue after the nanites attain sentience.
 The Norman Osborn incarnation of the Green Goblin appears as an alternate skin for Firebrand in Ultimate Marvel vs. Capcom 3. 
 Norman Osborn as the Green Goblin and Iron Patriot appears in Marvel Super Hero Squad Online, with the former identity (voiced by Yuri Lowenthal and Phil LaMarr) appearing as a boss while the latter (voiced by Charlie Adler) appears as a playable character.
 The Norman Osborn incarnation of the Green Goblin appears in LittleBigPlanet via the "Marvel Costume Kit 4" DLC.
 The Norman Osborn incarnation of the Green Goblin appears as a boss in Marvel: Avengers Alliance.
 The Norman Osborn incarnation of the Green Goblin appears as a playable character in Marvel Heroes.
 The Norman Osborn incarnation of the Green Goblin appears as a playable character and boss in Lego Marvel Super Heroes, voiced by Nolan North. He joins forces with Doctor Doom to obtain Cosmic Bricks.
 Additionally, the Ultimate Spider-Man animated series' incarnation of Norman Osborn / Green Goblin appears as a playable character, voiced by John DiMaggio.
 Norman Osborn as the Green Goblin, Iron Patriot, and Red Goblin appears as separate playable characters in Marvel Contest of Champions.
 The  Ultimate Spider-Man animated series' incarnation of Norman Osborn / Green Goblin appears as a playable character and boss in Disney Infinity 2.0, voiced by Nolan North. He joins forces with Mysterio to clone the Venom symbiote and launch an invasion of New York.
 Norman Osborn as the Iron Patriot and the mainstream, Ultimate Marvel and No Way Home incarnations of the Green Goblin appear as separate playable characters in Marvel: Future Fight. 
 The Ultimate Spider-Man animated series' incarnation of the Green Goblin appears as a playable character in Disney Infinity 3.0.
 A modernized incarnation of the Green Goblin appears in Marvel: Avengers Alliance 2.
 The Norman Osborn incarnation of the Green Goblin appears as a playable character in Marvel Puzzle Quest.
 The Norman Osborn incarnation of the Green Goblin appears as a playable character in Marvel Avengers Academy, voiced by Brandon Winckler.
 The Norman Osborn incarnation of the Green Goblin appears as a playable character in Lego Marvel Super Heroes 2. Additionally, his 2099 counterpart is also playable and serves as a boss.
 The Norman Osborn incarnation of the Green Goblin appears in Marvel Strike Force as a member of the Sinister Six.
 The Norman Osborn incarnation of the Green Goblin appears as a boss in Marvel Ultimate Alliance 3: The Black Order, voiced again by Steve Blum. While leading the Sinister Six in an assault on and hostile takeover of the Raft, he obtains the Time Stone due to Star-Lord teleporting the Infinity Stones across the universe. However, the Goblin succumbs to its power and becomes trapped in a time loop until he witnesses a vision of Thanos with all six stones standing atop Earth's heroes' bodies. Spider-Man offers the Goblin a second chance to save the universe before Thanos claims the Infinity Stones, but the Goblin is left severely traumatized by the vision.
 The Norman Osborn incarnation of the Green Goblin makes a cameo appearance in Marvel vs. Capcom: Infinite.
 The Norman Osborn incarnation of the Green Goblin appears in Marvel Future Revolution, voiced again by Steve Blum.

Miscellaneous
 The Norman Osborn incarnation of the Green Goblin appears in Universal Orlando Resort's Islands of Adventure.
 The Norman Osborn incarnation of the Green Goblin appears in the live adaptation of Spider-Man and Mary Jane Watson's wedding.
 The Norman Osborn incarnation of the Green Goblin appears in Spider-Man: Turn Off the Dark. As revenge for abandoning him and Oscorp, he brainwashes six scientists and turns them into his Sinister Six 
 The Norman Osborn incarnation of the Green Goblin appears in Marvel Universe: LIVE! as a member of the Sinister Six.

Merchandise

 The Green Goblin received several figures from Mego.
 An "Energized" Green Goblin received a figure from Remco.
 A Green Goblin figurine was included as an accessory in Corgi's "Spider-Buggy" vehicle set.
 The Green Goblin received a figure in Toy Biz's Marvel Superheroes line.
 The Green Goblin received a figure in Series 3 of Toy Biz's Spider-Man: The Animated Series line, with his glider being based on the one seen in issues 199 & 200 of The Spectacular Spider-Man (1993).
 The Green Goblin received eight figures in Toy Biz's Spider-Man: The Movie toy line.
 The Green Goblin received a figure in Toy Biz's Marvel Legends line via the "Onslaught Series" sub-line.
 The mainstream and Ultimate Marvel incarnations of the Green Goblin received bobble-heads from Way Out Toys.
 The Green Goblin received a figurine in The Classic Marvel Figurine Collection.
 The Green Goblin received two figures in Diamond Select Toys' Marvel Select line.
 The Green Goblin received a bobble-head in Funko's Wacky Wobbler line.
 The Green Goblin received a figure in Funko's Pop! vinyl figure line.
 The Green Goblin received a figure in Hasbro's Marvel Legends line.

References

External links

Green Goblin